Slane Beg is a townland in County Westmeath, Ireland.

Slane Beg is one of 11 townlands of the civil parish of Dysart in the barony of Moyashel and Magheradernon in the Province of Leinster. The neighbouring townlands are: Johnstown to the north, Lugnagullagh and Ballyboy to the east, Slane More and Parcellstown to the south, Kildallan to the west and Sonna Demesne to the north–west.

In the 1911 census of Ireland there were 8 houses and 29 inhabitants in the townland.

References

External links
Map of Slane Beg at openstreetmap.org
Slane Beg at The IreAtlas Townland Data Base
Slane Beg at Townlands.ie
Slane Beg at the Placenames Database of Ireland

Townlands of County Westmeath